The designation Kosmos ( meaning Cosmos) is a generic name given to a large number of Soviet Union, and subsequently Russian, satellites, the first of which was launched in 1962. Satellites given Kosmos designations include military spacecraft, failed probes to the Moon and the planets, prototypes for crewed spacecraft, and scientific spacecraft. This is a list of satellites with Kosmos designations between 2501 and 2750.

See also 

 List of USA satellites

References 

 2501